Wardleys Pub was a public house on Wardley's Lane in the civil parish of Stalmine-with-Staynall, near the village of Hambleton, Lancashire. The building dated to the 18th century and occupied a location, on the eastern banks of the River Wyre and beside Wardleys Creek, believed to have been used since Roman times. Prior to nearby Fleetwood's emergence as a harbour, people emigrated to the Americas from the creek, including aboard the Quebec-bound Six Sisters on 3 April 1833. The harbour's foundation rocks are still visible beneath today's wooden jetty. A ferry used to run from Cockle Hall, on the western side of the river, to Wardleys Creek. Parts of the pier are still visible in the marsh in front of where Cockle Hall once stood.

In the 1890s, during part of its life as a hotel, it was owned by Thomas Houghton. In the 1950s, R.F. Fyles was the proprietor. It was also a farm during that era, and a fire destroyed its barn in December 1899; the hotel was not affected.<ref>[https://books.google.com/books?id=c204AQAAMAAJ&dq=wardleys+hotel+hambleton&pg=PA705 The Mark Lane Express, Agricultural Journal (1899), p. 705]</ref>

After the pub's closure in 2005, the building fell into disuse and dereliction, during which time it was used as a marijuana-growing location on its upper floors and a Chinese restaurant on the ground floor. It closed in late 2010 and burned down on 25 April, 2011. It was then demolished, and has now been replaced by a dwelling, built by the last owner of the pub.

Gallery

References

External links
 
A 19th-century view of the pub. C&S Ales was a brewery in Blackpool
The River Wyre Ports, Skippool Creek and Wardleys – Poulton, Blackpool & the Fylde Coast – History of Lancs'', John Ellis

Former pubs in England
Buildings and structures in the Borough of Wyre
18th-century establishments in England
Defunct hotels in England
Buildings and structures demolished in 2011